For the 20th-century baseball second baseman, see Marty Barrett (second baseman).

Martin F. Barrett  (November 10, 1860 – January 29, 1910) was an American Major League Baseball catcher. He played in 1884 for the Boston Beaneaters of the National League and the Indianapolis Hoosiers of the American Association.

External links
Baseball-Reference page

1860 births
1910 deaths
19th-century baseball players
Major League Baseball catchers
Boston Beaneaters players
Indianapolis Hoosiers (AA) players
Boston Reserves players
Manchester Farmers players
Waterbury (minor league baseball) players
Baseball players from New York (state)